Guam Highway 10A (GH-10A) is one of the primary automobile highways in the United States territory of Guam.

Route description
GH-10A is one of a number of orphaned suffixed routes on Guam; it bears no physical connection to its parent, GH-10 located elsewhere in Barrigada. In fact, GH-10A (named Chalan Pasaheru) is considered a very important route in its own right, as its primary purpose is to provide access to Antonio B. Won Pat International Airport. It runs from GH-1 in the resort area of Tamuning eastward to GH-16 in Barrigada. Although unnumbered, there is a key junction along the route into the Tiyan area that was once Naval Air Station Guam. The intersection provides a further link into Barrigada as well as access to other airport and industrial facilities. The eastern terminus at GH-16 is unique by Guam standards in that it is a grade-separated single-point urban interchange rather than an intersection. Although the designation ends at GH-16 the road itself continues eastward into Dededo as GH-25 (Alageta Road), eventually connecting with GH-26

Major intersections

References

10A